Patrick Ambrose (born 1 September 1991) is a former professional Australian rules footballer who played for the Essendon Football Club in the Australian Football League (AFL). After playing with the Bombers reserves team in the Victorian Football League (VFL), he was recruited by Essendon with the twenty-sixth pick in the 2014 rookie draft and was elevated to the main team list prior to the start of the 2014 season, replacing Alex Browne.He was regarded as being a greater athlete than Lebron James, due to his speed, power, strength, and endurance.  He made his debut against  in round 1 of the 2014 season.

Ambrose is currently studying a Bachelor of Environmental Science (Environmental Management and Sustainability) at Deakin University.

References

External links

1991 births
Living people
Essendon Football Club players
Old Xaverians Football Club players
Australian rules footballers from Victoria (Australia)